Douglas Appling (born May 27, 1987), better known by his stage name, Emancipator, is an American producer and DJ based in Portland, Oregon, United States. He launched his music career by self-releasing his debut album, Soon It Will Be Cold Enough, in 2006 while he was a college student. He has released eight studio albums (two of which are collaboration albums), two live albums, five EPs and three remix collections. He also founded his own record label, Loci Records, in 2012 and formed a live band called the Emancipator Ensemble in 2013.

Early life

Doug Appling was born and raised in Virginia, where he studied violin from ages 4 to 12, progressing to electric guitar, drums and bass as a teenager. He cites his father's "eclectic music collection" as sparking his interest in electronic music, while his mother "who'd volunteered in the Peace Corps" exposed him to "African thumb pianos and sounds from beyond the Western palette." He played drums in a rock group in high school that won its prom's "battle of the bands" competition. On how he got his start producing, Appling stated, "I got hooked on [producing electronic music] when I started chopping up loops in Acid Pro for fun in high school." After high school, Doug attended the College of William & Mary in Williamsburg, Virginia, completing an undergraduate degree in psychology. While there, he took a number of classes in music theory, which influenced him as an artist. He self-released his first solo album, Soon It Will Be Cold Enough, under the name "Emancipator" in 2006. Distribution was limited since he burned the CDs at home, sold them via his MySpace channel and "hand-delivered them to the post office every week."

Career

In late 2007, Emancipator came to the attention of Nujabes' Japanese label, Hydeout Productions, which re-released Soon It Will Be Cold Enough in April 2008. Moving to his current home of Portland, Oregon, in 2009, he played his first live U.S. show as the opening act for Bonobo, who Appling admits is "one of [his] favorite producers." This, along with a tour of Japan in 2008–2009, helped to provide exposure to larger audiences both at home and abroad. During this timeframe, he switched from using Acid Pro and Reason to using Ableton Live as his music sequencer and digital audio workstation software for all of his productions. His second album, Safe in the Steep Cliffs, was released in January 2010 on the Hydeout label to some acclaim. Remixes, an album of reworked versions of Emancipator tracks by Blockhead, Big Gigantic, Tor and others, was self-released in 2011. Around this time, Appling began touring with a live violinist, Ilya Goldberg; the duo drew positive critical attention. In 2012, Appling founded his own label, Loci Records, and released the album Drum Therapy by Tor as the label's debut album.

2013 saw the release of Emancipator's third studio album, Dusk to Dawn, his first album on Loci Records. Significant touring and studio work followed the release of the record and a four-piece full-band, Emancipator Ensemble, debuted for live audiences.

In 2015, Emancipator released his first live album, Live from Athens, in June; his second remix album, Dusk to Dawn Remixes, in July; and his fourth studio album, Seven Seas, in September.

Emancipator's fifth studio album, Baralku, was released in November 2017. The album, named for a spiritual island where some Australian indigenous tribes believe the dead reside, was supported by three singles: "Ghost Pong," "Goodness" and "Baralku."

In January 2020, Emancipator released a new single, "Labyrinth," along with the title of his sixth studio album, Mountain of Memory, and announced a tour for the album. At the end of February 2020, Emancipator released his second single off the album, "Iron Ox."  On April 3, 2020, Emancipator released his sixth studio album, Mountain of Memory.

Discography

Studio albums

EPs

Remix albums

Live albums

Singles

References

External links 
 
 Loci Records Official Website
 Emancipator on Bandcamp
 
 
 Emancipator on Myspace

1987 births
Living people
Chill-out musicians
College of William & Mary alumni
Downtempo musicians
Musicians from Portland, Oregon
Record producers from Oregon
Trip hop musicians